Urophora lopholomae is a species of tephritid or fruit flies in the genus Urophora of the family Tephritidae.

Distribution
Austria, Hungary, Moldova.

References

Urophora
Insects described in 1989
Diptera of Europe